Shane Edward O'Neill (born September 2, 1993) is a professional soccer player who plays as a center-back for Major League Soccer club Toronto FC. Born in Ireland, he represented the United States at international level.

Club career

Colorado Rapids 
O'Neill joined the U.S. Soccer Development Academy with the Colorado Rapids youth system in 2009. He led the Rapids U18 team in scoring in 2011–12 with 10 goals in 15 games, helping them reach the playoffs.

O'Neill originally signed to play college soccer at the University of Virginia, however on June 19, 2012, O'Neill signed with the Colorado Rapids as a Home Grown Player. Three months later, he made his professional debut in a 3–0 victory over the Portland Timbers, coming on as an 86th minute substitute for Jeff Larentowicz. O'Neill became a regular starter in 2013 and received strong reviews, earning the Rapids' Young Player of the Year award and a nomination for U.S. Soccer Young Athlete of the Year as the Rapids returned to the playoffs. His first career goal came in a 4–1 home win over Montreal Impact on May 25, 2014.

Apollon Limassol 
On August 7, 2015, O'Neill was bought by Cypriot club Apollon Limassol for an undisclosed fee. On August 31, 2015 he was loaned out to Royal Mouscron-Péruwelz in Belgium. The loan was cut short on December 23, 2015, and he returned to Limassol having not made an appearance for the Belgian club. He had subsequent loan spells with League 2 side Cambridge United and NAC Breda in Jupiler League, never featuring for Apollon Limassol.

Excelsior 
O'Neill joined Excelsior on a one-year deal for the 2017–18 season.

Orlando City 
In June 2018, O'Neill returned to MLS when he signed a three-and-a-half-year contract with Orlando City. He made his debut in a U.S. Open Cup quarterfinal defeat to Philadelphia Union on July 18 and made his MLS debut for the club three days later at Columbus. On November 21, 2019, it was announced O'Neill had his contract option for the 2020 season declined by Orlando as part of the end-of-season roster decisions.

Seattle Sounders FC 
On January 14, 2020, O'Neill signed with Seattle Sounders FC. O'Neill made his Sounders debut on February 20 coming in as a substitute against CD Olimpia in the Concacaf Champions League. He scored his first goal for the club in the 2020 MLS Cup Playoffs on December 1 against FC Dallas.

Toronto FC
On December 22, 2021, O'Neill signed a three-year contract, beginning in 2022, as a free agent with Toronto FC. He made his debut on February 26 in the season opener against FC Dallas, as a substitute.

International career
O'Neill is eligible to represent both the United States and the Republic of Ireland. On October 9, 2012, O'Neill was called up by the United States U20 national team for the 2012 Marbella Cup in Spain. A day later, O'Neill made his debut for the U20s in a 2–1 loss to Canada, however he suffered an eye injury that ruled him out for the rest of the tournament. He later played for the US at the 2013 FIFA U-20 World Cup.

He has yet to debut for the US senior team and has indicated a willingness to accept a call for his native Ireland. He participated in a US camp in January 2014, although he was dropped prior to a friendly against South Korea. He was called up to the United States senior squad for a friendly against Panama in February 2015.

Personal life 
O'Neill is the son of former All-Ireland winning Cork Gaelic footballer, Colm O'Neill, and is a nephew of former Kerry Gaelic footballer, Maurice Fitzgerald. O'Neill is the younger brother of Darragh O'Neill, a former punter for Colorado Buffaloes football team.

O'Neill's family immigrated to the United States from Ireland when he was a toddler after his father won a green card through the Diversity Immigrant Visa lottery program.

O'Neill grew up in Boulder, Colorado and attended Fairview High School. In his senior year of high school, O'Neill was named the Colorado's player of the year by Gatorade and selected to the All-Colorado boys soccer team. O'Neill played basketball in high school and was named to the second-team all-5A team for his performances during his senior year. Although he committed to the University of Virginia, O'Neill ultimately signed with his hometown team the Colorado Rapids at the age of 18.

Career statistics

Club

References

External links
 
 

1993 births
Living people
American soccer players
American expatriate soccer players
Irish emigrants to the United States
Colorado Rapids players
Apollon Limassol FC players
Royal Excel Mouscron players
Cambridge United F.C. players
NAC Breda players
Excelsior Rotterdam players
Orlando City SC players
Seattle Sounders FC players
Toronto FC players
Association football defenders
Republic of Ireland association footballers
Association footballers from County Cork
Expatriate footballers in Cyprus
Expatriate footballers in Belgium
Expatriate footballers in the Netherlands
Major League Soccer players
Eerste Divisie players
United States men's under-20 international soccer players
United States men's under-23 international soccer players
Eredivisie players
People from Midleton
Soccer players from Colorado
Homegrown Players (MLS)
Sportspeople from Boulder, Colorado